Hazel Heald (April 6, 1896February 4, 1961) was a pulp fiction writer, who lived in Somerville, Massachusetts. She is perhaps best known for collaborating with American horror fiction writer H. P. Lovecraft.

Biography
Heald was born the daughter of William W. Heald and Oraetta J. Drake in 1896. She is buried at Lakeview Cemetery in Maine.

Collaborations
 The Man of Stone (1932)
 The Horror in the Burying-Ground (1933)
 The Horror in the Museum (1933)
 Winged Death (1934). "My share in it is something like 90 to 95%", wrote Lovecraft to August Derleth, of this over-the-top comic-horror story.
 Out of the Aeons (1935)

References

External links 

 
 
 
 

1896 births
1961 deaths
Writers from Somerville, Massachusetts
Cthulhu Mythos writers
Pulp fiction writers
20th-century American women writers